Malcolm Mooney (born 1944) is an American singer, poet, and artist, best known as the original vocalist for German krautrock band Can.

Biography
Mooney began singing in high school, and was a member of an a cappella vocal group known as the Six-Fifths. He gained some fame as a sculptor in New York City, then moved to Germany where he became a friend of Irmin Schmidt and Holger Czukay, who were forming a band. Mooney joined as lead vocalist. The band was originally known as "Inner Space", but Mooney came up with "The Can", later shortened to Can.

An album of material was recorded, initially entitled Prepared To Meet Thy Pnoom, although no record company was willing to release it; it was later released in 1981 as Delay 1968. Can's second album became their debut, Monster Movie, released in 1969. It was successful in the German underground scene. Various other tracks that Mooney recorded with the band during this period appear on the compilation albums Soundtracks and Unlimited Edition. Mooney quit the band and returned to America soon after the recording of Monster Movie, having been told by a psychiatrist that getting away from the chaotic music of Can would be better for his mental health. The liner notes from the album claim erroneously that Mooney suffered a nervous breakdown, shouting "upstairs, downstairs" repeatedly.

He rejoined Can in 1986 to record a one-off reunion album, Rite Time. He also has released three albums with the San Francisco Bay Area band Tenth Planet, on the first of which, a new version of the song "Father Cannot Yell" from Monster Movie appears. For the second Tenth Planet album, a different line-up was introduced, and the album saw a limited release in Japan on the P-Vine label. Prior to its issue, the Unfortunate Miracle label issued a limited 7" picture disc single containing two early mixes from the forthcoming album. In 2002, Mooney was invited to sing on Andy Votel's "All Ten Fingers" album – on the song "Salted Tangerines", a version of Mooney's poem of the same name. The Tenth Planet released an album on Milviason Records entitled inCANtations. Mooney now focuses on his visual art. In 2007, Matthew Higgs invited Mooney to exhibit a piece at New York's venerable White Columns.

In 2013, Mooney began to collaborate with drummer, songwriter and producer Sean Noonan, along with Jamaaladeen Tacuma and Aram Bajakian, to record Pavees Dance: There's Always the Night. The group performed in February 2014 at the Sons D'Hiver festival in France in advance of the release of the June 2014 release of the CD and accompanying book featuring lyrics and Mooney's art work.

In April 2017, Mooney appeared at The Barbican Centre in London as the lead singer of The Can Project, a reunion concert with Irmin Schmidt joined by Sonic Youth's Thurston Moore and My Bloody Valentine's Debbie Googe. Jaki Liebezeit, Can's drummer, had recently died. The concert received mixed reviews and suffered sound issues, especially with Mooney's vocals.

In 2021, Mooney's work was exhibited at Aspen Art Museum in the exhibition Winterfest.

In 2022, Mooney had an exhibition at Ulrik in New York titled "Works 1970-1986." Mooney produced his first geometric works in 1970 as set designs for a theater play titled  “Harlem Angel.” Shortly after he began work on a series of eponymous silk screens at his father’s print shop in Yonkers, New York. He describes the origin of these pieces as developed from an image of kente cloth viewed under a microscope. This image continued to inform his paintings and drawings of grids throughout the 1970s and 1980s. Mooney’s interest evolved further through his encounter with the 1972 exhibition “African Textiles and Decorative Arts” at the Museum of Modern Art, his friendship with textile curator and shopkeeper Sara Penn as well as his own work in the mechanical processes of textile design.

From experiments with utilitarian objects to stage and lighting design, from graphic design to work with textiles, clothing, and even runway shows, there persists an ongoing migration between the applied and “high art” in Mooney’s work which intentionally cross-pollinates both.

Discography
Malcolm Mooney appears on the following original albums:

With Can:

 Monster Movie (1969)
 Soundtracks (1970)
 Unlimited Edition (1976) – compilation, includes all the tracks on earlier Limited Edition
 Delay 1968 (1981) – compilation
 Rite Time (1989)
 Anthology (1994) – compilation
 The Lost Tapes (2012) – compilation, 3-CD and 5-LP box set

With Tenth Planet:
 Malcolm Mooney and the Tenth Planet (1998)
 Hysterica (2006)
 inCANtations (2011)

White Columns: with Luis Tovar and Alex Marcelo
Malcolm Mooney (2011)

With Andy Votel:
 All Ten Fingers (2002)

With Dave Tyack
 Rip Van Winkle (2003)

With Sean Noonan 
 Pavees Dance: There's Always the Night (2014)
   Tan Man's Hat (2019)

With Jane Weaver
 Modern Kosmology (2017)

Videography
Romantic Warriors IV: Krautrock (2019)

Notes

Works cited

External links
 Malcolm Mooney
 Sean Noonan
 Malcolm Mooney at Ulrik, NYC

1948 births
American expatriates in Germany
American rock singers
Living people
Can (band) members
German rock singers
African-American rock singers